Dynomite! is a PC game developed by Raptisoft Games and published by PopCap Games. Its gameplay is largely similar to that of the Puzzle Bobble series, but it has several unique differences.

Gameplay 
There are four game modes: Endless, Stomped, Fossil, and Time Trial.

Endless Puzzle (Panic in Eggsucker/Original Version of Dynomite) 
Rows of eggs of various colors descend from the top of the screen. The player must use their slingshot to shoot their own supply of eggs up at them. When three or more eggs of the same color match, they will explode. If the mass of eggs descend to the bottom of the screen, an alarm will sound and the player will have three seconds to break any eggs that reached the bottom, or else the entire screen will be crushed by the foot of Mama Brontosaurus, and the game will end.

An interesting aspect to make the game increasingly difficult as the player plays a single game for a longer amount of time is the inclusion of Whirley. Every minute or so during gameplay, a dinosaur will announce "Whirley's coming!", and soon after, Whirley (a purple pterodactyl) will fly across the screen carrying an egg of a color not yet on their screen. If Whirley is allowed to fly across the screen untouched, the color of his egg will be added to the palette of colors in the egg mass, and the rate of the eggs' descent will reset to the default slow speed. However, if players shoot and hit Whirley, the color will not be added, but the rate at which the eggs descend will increase.

Some eggs in an egg mass will occasionally vibrate for a short period of time. If they are made to explode while still vibrating, a player soon receives a special egg for the slingshot that offers some form of bonus when shot and eventually forced to explode: the play area either narrows or widens to increase/decrease the speed of the dropping egg mass, the play area raises upward (only given when the eggs are very close to the warning line), the player receives a one-time bonus of (50, 100, or 200) points, an automatic score multiplier (2x, 3x or 4x) for 30 seconds, or the ability to see the full trajectory (including rebounds) of the egg to be shot for one minute.

Stomped (Clear 'Em in Eggsucker/Original Version of Dynomite) 
A puzzle arrangement appears on the screen. The goal is to clear the arrangement by shooting matching eggs of the corresponding colour next to it. However, every egg the player shoots will increase Mama Bronto's anger meter. Every time the meter gets full, Mama Bronto pushes the puzzle down one notch with her foot, making the board more difficult to accomplish. There are 32 stomped puzzles, and after completing all 32, level 33 will start the puzzles from the beginning again.

Fossil (Fossil in Eggsucker/Original Version of Dynomite) 
A piece of a dinosaur fossil is surrounded by eggs, and the player must shoot matching eggs to break the piece free and add it to a collection of completed fossils. There are 15 fossils, each having three fragments, for a total of 45 levels in this mode. Like Endless Puzzle, if the eggs and fossil piece reach the bottom of the screen, Mama Bronto will crush the screen and the game is over.

Time Trial (Grande in Eggsucker/Original Version of Dynomite) 
A multi-layered arrangement of eggs (60 rows and five colors in Easy mode, 30 rows and seven colors in Normal mode, and 15 rows and nine colors in Hard mode) must be cleared by shooting the correctly colored eggs at the ones on screen. If there are 90 rows, trying to add an egg to make the 91st row will break the egg instead. Unlike the other games, this one does not have a time limit; instead, it keeps a record of the player's five fastest clearances across all difficulties.

Versions 
There are two versions of this game: the Java applet-based web version, and the downloadable version (called Dynomite Deluxe). Dynomite Deluxe includes enhanced graphics, a musical soundtrack by Skaven, the ability to upload high scores, and full functionality for all game modes. Dynomite Deluxe is available to purchase either from Origin, or through Steam.

External links 
 

2002 video games
PopCap games
Puzzle video games
Video games developed in the United States
Video games scored by Peter Hajba
Windows games
Windows-only games
Dinosaurs in video games
Single-player video games